Edward Jackson Brundage (May 13, 1869 – January 20, 1934) was an American lawyer and politician.
Born in Campbell, New York, Brundage moved with his parents to Detroit, Michigan. He worked in a railroad office in Detroit, Michigan and then moved to Chicago, Illinois when the general office moved there. Brundage became chief clerk in 1888. He studied law and received his law degree from Chicago-Kent College of Law in 1893. Brundage served in the Illinois House of Representatives and was a Republican. In November 1904, Brundage was elected President of the Cook County Board of Commissioners and was reelected in 1906. In 1907, Brundage served as corporation counsel for the City of Chicago. From 1917 to 1925, Brundage served as Illinois Attorney General. Brundage committed suicide at his home in Lake Forest, Illinois, because of financial problems, by firing a bullet through his heart.

Family
Edward Brundage was the uncle of Olympic President Avery Brundage. Brundage was also the uncle of Stanley C. Armstrong who also served in the Illinois General Assembly.

Notes

External links
 

1869 births
1934 suicides
American politicians who committed suicide
Chicago-Kent College of Law alumni
Illinois Attorneys General
Lawyers from Detroit
Republican Party members of the Illinois House of Representatives
People from Lake Forest, Illinois
People from Steuben County, New York
Politicians from Chicago
Politicians from Detroit
Presidents of the Cook County Board of Commissioners
Suicides by firearm in Illinois